David Orbansky or 'Urbansky' was a Union Army soldier during the American Civil War. He earned the Medal of Honor for his gallantry in action against enemy Confederate States Army forces in the Battle of Shiloh, Tennessee, in 1862 and again at the Siege of Vicksburg, Mississippi, in 1863, as well as other actions. During the Vicksburg campaign, Urbansky rushed onto the battlefield to pick up his commander and under enemy fire, made it back to the Union line. He was buried at Piqua’s Cedar Hill Jewish cemetery and later reinterred at Walnut Hills United Jewish Cemetery in Evanston, Ohio, a neighborhood in the city of Cincinnati.

Medal of Honor citation
 Rank and organization: Private, Company B, 58th Ohio Infantry
 Place and date: At Shiloh, Tenn.; Vicksburg, Miss., etc., 1862 and 1863.
 Entered service at: Columbus, Ohio.
 Birth: Lautenburg, Prussia.
 Date of issue: August 2, 1879.

Citation:
Gallantry in actions.

See also
 List of Medal of Honor recipients
 List of Jewish Medal of Honor recipients
 List of American Civil War Medal of Honor recipients: M–P

References

 

1843 births
1897 deaths
People from Działdowo County
American Civil War recipients of the Medal of Honor
Foreign-born Medal of Honor recipients
Jewish Medal of Honor recipients
People from Columbus, Ohio
People of Ohio in the American Civil War
Prussian emigrants to the United States
United States Army Medal of Honor recipients
Union Army soldiers